The CONCACAF–CONMEBOL play-off for the 2016 Summer Olympics was a men's under-23 international football play-off between a team from CONCACAF (North, Central America and Caribbean) and a team from CONMEBOL (South America), with the winner qualifying for the final berth in the 2016 Summer Olympics men's football tournament.

Colombia qualified to the Olympics with a 3–2 aggregate win over the United States, after a 1–1 draw in the first leg and a 1–2 win in the second leg.

Qualified teams
The CONCACAF representative was the United States, who finished third at the 2015 CONCACAF Men's Olympic Qualifying Championship.
The CONMEBOL representative was Colombia, who finished second at the 2015 South American Youth Football Championship.

Matches
Originally qualification was to be decided using a single-leg tie in Rio de Janeiro, Brazil. However, in October 2015, the International Olympic Committee announced that the play-off would be a home and away series. The first leg was hosted by Colombia, while the second leg was hosted by the United States.

First leg

Second leg

Goalscorers

References

External links
Olympic Qualifying – Men, CONCACAF.com
Juegos Olímpicos Río 2016, CONMEBOL.com

Play-off
Summer Olympics CONCACAF-CONMEBOL play-off 2016
Summer Olympics CONCACAF-CONMEBOL play-off 2016
2016 in American soccer
2016 in Colombian football